Vild med dans is the Danish version of Dancing with the Stars and is shown by TV 2 in Denmark. Seasons 1 and 2 were co-hosted by Andrea Elisabeth Rudolph and Peter Hansen. Rudolph and Hansen were replaced in season 3 by Christine Lorentzen and Claus Elming. Rudolph returned to take Lorentzen's place as co-host from seasons 4 to 6. Season 7, 8 and 9 saw Christiane Schaumburg-Müller take Rudolph's place as Elming's co-host. Since season 10, Elming has co-hosted with Sarah Grünewald.

The original judges were Britt Bendixen, Jens Werner, Anne Laxholm and Kim Dahl . Dahl was replaced by Thomas Evers Poulsen, who is currently the only person to appear on the show as both a professional and judge. Allan Tornsberg took Poulsen's place as the fourth judge from seasons 3 through 7. Nikolaj Hübbe joined the panel as a replacement for Tornsberg in season 8 and has remained there since. The newest addition to the judges panel is Sonny Fredie Pedersen who joined the show in 2022 on season 19.

Hosts
Key:
 Main host
 Guest host

Notes
 From season 9, 11 to 13 Andrea Elisabeth Rudolph returned as guest host for one week. 
 In season 12, Sara Maria Franch-Mærkedahl served as guest host for one week.

Series overview

Professional partners 
Color key:

 Winner
 Runner-up
 3rd place
 Celebrity partner was eliminated first for the season
 Celebrity partner withdrew from the competition
 A professional couple of weeks, and then does not appear on the show
 Still participating on the show

Season 1 (Spring 2005)
The first season of Vild med dans ("Mad about Dancing") was aired on the Danish TV-channel TV 2 in 2005 and the contestants were:

Scoring charts

Red numbers indicate the lowest score for each week
Green numbers indicate the highest score for each week
 the couple eliminated that week
 the winning couple
 the runner-up couple
 the third-place couple

Season 2 (Autumn 2005)

Scoring charts

Red numbers indicate the lowest score for each week
Green numbers indicate the highest score for each week
 indicates the couple eliminated that week
 indicates the returning couple that finished in the bottom two
 indicates the winning couple
 indicates the runner-up couple
 indicates the third-place couple

Season 3 (2006)

Scoring charts

Red numbers indicate the lowest score for each week
Green numbers indicate the highest score for each week
 indicates the couple eliminated that week
 indicates the returning couple that finished in the bottom two
 indicates the winning couple
 indicates the runner-up couple
 indicates the third-place couple

Season 4 (2007)
The fourth season ended 16 November 2007.

Scoring charts

Red numbers indicate the lowest score for each week
Green numbers indicate the highest score for each week
 indicates the couple eliminated that week
 indicates the returning couple that finished in the bottom two
 indicates the winning couple
 indicates the runner-up couple
 indicates the third-place couple

Christmas Gala 2007

Season 5 (2008)

Scoring charts

Red numbers indicate the lowest score for each week
Green numbers indicate the highest score for each week
 indicates the couple eliminated that week
 indicates the returning couple that finished in the bottom two
 indicates the winning couple
 indicates the runner-up couple
 indicates the third-place couple

Season 6 (2009)

Scoring charts

Red numbers indicate the lowest score for each week
Green numbers indicate the highest score for each week
 indicates the couple eliminated that week
 indicates the returning couple that finished in the bottom two
 indicates the winning couple
 indicates the runner-up couple
 indicates the third-place couple

Season 7 (2010)

Scoring charts

Red numbers indicate the lowest score for each week
Green numbers indicate the highest score for each week
 indicates the couple eliminated that week
 indicates the returning couple that finished in the bottom two
 indicates the winning couple
 indicates the runner-up couple
 indicates the third-place couple

Season 8 (2011)

Scoring chart

Red numbers indicate the lowest score for each week
Green numbers indicate the highest score for each week
 indicates the couple eliminated that week
 indicates the returning couple that finished in the bottom two
 indicates the winning couple
 indicates the runner-up couple
 indicates the third-place couple

Season 9 (2012)

Scoring chart

Red numbers indicate the lowest score for each week
Green numbers indicate the highest score for each week
 indicates the couple eliminated that week
 indicates the returning couple that finished in the bottom two
 indicates the winning couple
 indicates the runner-up couple
 indicates the third-place couple

Season 10 (2013)

Scoring chart

Red numbers indicate the lowest score for each week
Green numbers indicate the highest score for each week
 indicates the couple eliminated that week
 indicates the returning couple that finished in the bottom two
 indicates the winning couple
 indicates the runner-up couple
 indicates the third-place couple

Season 11 (2014)

Season 12 (2015)

Season 13 (2016)

Season 14 (2017)

Season 15 (2018)

Season 16 (2019)

Season 17 (2020)

Season 18 (2021)

Season 19 (2022)

References

External links
"Vild Med Dans" official website (in Danish)
"Vild Med Dans" Blog (in Danish)

Dancing with the Stars
2005 Danish television series debuts
Dance competition television shows
2000s Danish television series
Danish reality television series
Danish television series based on British television series
Danish-language television shows
TV 2 (Denmark) original programming